Psilosis is the sound change in which Greek lost the consonant sound /h/ during antiquity. The term comes from the Greek  psī́lōsis ("smoothing, thinning out") and is related to the name of the smooth breathing (ψιλή psīlḗ), the sign for the absence of initial  in a word. Dialects that have lost  are called psilotic.

The linguistic phenomenon is comparable to that of h-dropping in dialects of Modern English and to the development by which /h/ was lost in late Latin.

History
The loss of /h/ happened at different times in different dialects of Greek. The eastern Ionic dialects, the Aeolic dialect of Lesbos, as well as the Doric dialects of Crete and Elis, were already psilotic at the beginning of their written record. In Attic, there was widespread variation in popular speech during the classical period, but the formal standard language retained /h/. This variation continued into the Hellenistic Koine. Alexandrine grammarians who codified Greek orthography during the second and first centuries BC, and who, among other things, introduced the signs for the rough and smooth breathings, were still using the distinction between words with and without initial /h/, but were evidently writing at a time when this distinction was no longer natively mastered by many speakers. By the late Roman and early Byzantine period, /h/ had been lost in all forms of the language.

Orthography

Eta and heta
The loss of the /h/ is reflected in the development of the Greek alphabet by the change in the function of the letter eta (Η), which first served as the sign of /h/ ("heta") but then, in the psilotic dialects, was reused as the sign of the long vowel /ɛː/.

Rough and smooth breathing
In the polytonic orthography that started in the Hellenistic period of Ancient Greek, the original /h/ sound, where it used to occur, is represented by a diacritic, the rough breathing or spiritus asper. This sign is also conventionally used in analogy to the Attic usage when rendering texts from the Ionic dialect, which was already psilotic by the time the texts were written. For Aeolic texts, however, the convention is to mark all words as non-aspirated.

See also
Ancient Greek phonology

References

Ancient Greek
Phonology